Calla is an unincorporated community in Mahoning County, in the U.S. state of Ohio. The community lies about 4 miles (6.5 km) south of Canfield.

History
A post office called Calla was established in 1889, and remained in operation until 1933. Besides the post office, Calla has an Evangelical church, established in 1864.

References

Unincorporated communities in Mahoning County, Ohio
1889 establishments in Ohio
Populated places established in 1889
Unincorporated communities in Ohio